Lectionary 1685, designated by ℓ1685, in the Gregory-Aland numbering, is a Greek manuscript of the New Testament, on paper leaves, dated paleographically to the 16th century (or 15th century).

Description  

The codex contains some Lessons from the Gospels lectionary (Evangelistarium), from Acts of the Apostles and General epistles (Apostolos) with some lacunae. It is written in Greek minuscule letters, on 263 paper leaves (27.5 by 19 cm), 2 columns per page, 31 lines per page. 

The codex now is located in the Bible Museum Münster (MS. 16).

See also  

 List of New Testament lectionaries 
 Textual criticism 
 Bible Museum Münster

References

External links  

 Lectionary 1685 at the CSNTM 
 Manuscripts of the Bible Museum 

Greek New Testament lectionaries
16th-century biblical manuscripts